Photofeeler, founded in 2013, is a website that allows users to receive anonymous feedback on their photos from other users. Users can either pay for the service or earn credit by rating others' submissions. The site has three categories — business, social, and dating — each of which are rated for different qualities.

The company also runs a blog that provides tips for photographing profile pictures.

Photofeeler takes a mixed approach to analyze profile pictures using a combination of AI and human voting.

References

External links
 Official website

2013 establishments in Colorado
Companies based in Colorado
Online mass media companies of the United States